"Lost in the Flood" is a song by Bruce Springsteen.  It was released on his debut album, Greetings from Asbury Park, N.J. in 1973.

Music and themes 
"Lost in the Flood" is a sparse, piano-driven song, seemingly about a Vietnam War veteran. This is the first of many epic Springsteen songs that elicit strong emotions, usually of despair, grief, and small glimpse of hope. The treatment of veterans in the United States has always been a sore spot for Springsteen. The lyrics tell a loose story, invoking a series of images that tell three different stories for each of the three verses.

Lyrics 

The first verse is about a "ragamuffin gunner" and has a recurring theme of religion, including references to the "hit-and-run" pleading for "sanctuary" and hiding beneath a "holy stone", while "breakin' beams and crosses with a spastic's reeling perfection" and "nuns run bald through Vatican halls, pregnant, pleading Immaculate Conception". Finally, "everybody's wrecked on Main Street from drinking unholy blood".

The second verse is about a "pure American brother", "Jimmy the Saint", perhaps the same person as the "ragamuffin gunner" from the first verse. This is the beginning of Springsteen's use of automobile themes (along with "The Angel"), as the pure American brother "races Sundays in Jersey in a Chevy stock Super Eight" and "leans on the hood telling racing stories". Eventually, Jimmy the Saint gets into some sort of accident (described as running "headfirst into a hurricane") and presumably dies since "there was nothing left but some blood where the body fell".

The third verse concerns a series of people on the streets of a city, presumably New York. They include "Eighth Avenue sailors in satin shirts", "some storefront incarnation of Maria", "Bronx's best apostle", "the cops", "the whiz-bang gang" and "some kid" who gets shot in the ensuing gun fight and holds "his leg, screaming something in Spanish".

Personnel
According to authors Philippe Margotin and Jean-Michel Guesdon:
 Bruce Springsteen – vocals
 Vini "Mad Dog" Lopez – drums
 Garry Tallent – bass
 David Sancious – keyboards
 Steven Van Zandt – explosion sound effect through amplifier in the beginning. (Uncredited)

References

1973 songs
Bruce Springsteen songs
Songs written by Bruce Springsteen
Song recordings produced by Mike Appel